W and Z may refer to:

W and Z bosons, or weak bosons, elementary particles
W' and Z' bosons, hypothetical gauge bosons
W and Z class destroyer, destroyers of the Royal Navy launched in 1943–1944

See also
WZ (disambiguation)